Zaolian (literal meaning "early love") in mainland China means "to have a romantic relationship too early" and refers to adolescent romantic relationships before university. In China, many conservative parents and educators supporting examination-based education think that "zaolian" will bring many problems such as it will affect students' study ability and marks, or that zaolian relationships will almost always split in the end.

References

Chinese culture